Hamilcara is a monotypic moth genus in the family Cossidae. Its only species, Hamilcara atra, is found in North America, where it has been recorded from Arizona. The genus and species were first described by William Barnes and James Halliday McDunnough in 1910.

Former species
 Hamilcara gilensis Barnes & McDunnough, 1910, now Psychonoctua gilensis (Barnes & McDunnough, 1910)
 Hamilcara ramosa (Schaus, 1892), now Aramos ramosa (Schaus, 1892)

References

Zeuzerinae
Cossidae genera
Monotypic moth genera